Forton is a small village and civil parish in Staffordshire, England, situated east of the market town of Newport, Shropshire. The civil Parish population at the 2011 census was 308.

It is situated around Forton Hall and the 14th century All Saints church, and is sited on the Roman road Via Devana and the modern A519 road between Newport and Newcastle-under-Lyme.

Forton Hall was built by Edwin Skrymsher of Norbury Manor, Eccleshall, at the end of the 17th century and is situated adjacent to the church of All Saints.  In 1729 five new bells were given to the church. The most prominent monument is the alabaster tomb of Thomas Skrymsher (died 1633), knight of Aqualate and his family.

There is a pub called The Swan.

Notable people 
 Samuel Dugard (1645?–1697 in Forton) an English divine and rector of Forton 
 John Wedge (1744 in Forton – 1816) was an English agriculturalist and surveyor, owned various properties including a brass factory in Birmingham
 Charles Wedge (1746 in Aqualate Park – 1842) an English farmer who practised as a surveyor and assisted in the construction of canals. 
 Sir Charles Oakeley, 1st Baronet (1751 in Forton – 1826) an English administrator in India
 Thomas Wedge (1760 in Forton – 1854) an English agriculturalist

See also
Listed buildings in Forton, Staffordshire

References

External links

Villages in Staffordshire
Civil parishes in Staffordshire
Borough of Stafford